Enchantment is a 1921 American silent romantic comedy film produced by Cosmopolitan Productions and released by Paramount Pictures. The film was directed by Robert G. Vignola and starred Marion Davies. A print of the film exists in the Library of Congress.

Plot
Inspired by a staging of William Shakespeare's Taming of the Shrew, Marion Davies plays Ethel, the spoiled-brat daughter of millionaire Mr. Hoyt (Tom Lewis). Mr. Hoyt decides that a rough-and-tumble he-man might be able to straighten out his daughter. To that end, the millionaire hires Ernest Eddison (Forrest Stanley), the actor playing Petruchio in Shrew. Ernest talks Ethel into auditioning for an amateur production of Sleeping Beauty, then runs her roughshod during rehearsals. Ethel is on the verge of exploding when Ernest finally wins her over with a lulu of a third-act kiss.

Cast

Production 
In her 11th film, Marion Davies stars as a willful flapper in a modern-day comedy/drama. Production was highlighted by a massive pageant set designed by Joseph Urban. This was the first of six Davies films directed by Robert G. Vignola and the first of four Davies films to co-star Forrest Stanley.

Reception 
The film was named as "Best Picture of the month" by Photoplay in February 1922.

Status
A DVD was released by Edward Lorusso with a music score by Donald Sosin in February 2014. The film was broadcast on Turner Classic Movies in November 2014 and again in August 2017.

References

External links

Poster for Enchantment

1921 films
American silent feature films
Films directed by Robert G. Vignola
1921 romantic comedy films
American romantic comedy films
American black-and-white films
Surviving American silent films
1920s American films
Silent romantic comedy films
Silent American comedy films